Suck-Woo Park (born 1947), also known as Suku Park , is a South Korean contemporary ceramic artist and a council member of the International Academy of Ceramics (IAC).

Early life and education
Park was born in Seoul in 1947 and attended the Fine Arts College of the Seoul National University in South Korea (1966–1970) before moving to Stockholm, Sweden in 1974 to graduate from the Swedish State School of Arts & Design (Konstfack).

Work 

In early 1980s Suku Park was the art director for Pentik and lived with his family in Posio, Finland. He worked there 1984-1987 and has since his international career returned to Posio in 2011. In 1984 Suku Park moved his studio and his family to Espoo, and later in 1997 was one of the first members of Onoma (The Cooperative of Artisans, Designers and Artists in Fiskars).

Park's international career began from Posio and he has since exhibited in multiple countries with collections amongst others in the Nationalmuseum in Stockholm, Museum of Painting and Sculpture in Istanbul and Musée Ariana in Geneva. Park was a professor at Sangmyung University in Seoul, South Korea from early 2000 and has since moved back to Finland and Lapland where he lives and works.

On Posio and living in Finland affecting his work, Park stated that "My language of form and expression is not Korean, but a reaction inside myself to form things with my own hands in order to give an object its own character. When I'm designing I'm thinking function, but I'm thinking humour too". He continues that his works is influenced by the environment and was fascinated with Posio and the focus he could have there.

Park is the council member of IAC in Geneva, Switzerland, member of Konsthantverkarna, Stockholm, Sweden, Ceramic Group Kuusi, Finland.

Exhibitions

Park's selected solo exhibitions include: Anthony Shaw Gallery, London, United Kingdom (1978); Lotte Gallery, Seoul, South Korea (1980); Retretti Art Center, Retretti, Finland (1985); Illums Bolighus, Copenhagen, Denmark (1985); Norway Design Center, Oslo, Norway (1985); Konsthantverkarna, Stockholm, Sweden (1986, 1989); Andrew Shire Gallery, Los Angeles, United States (1990); Mikimoto Art Hall, Ginza, Tokyo, Japan (1989, 1992); SSamjigil Seoul, South Korea; Gallery Park Ryusook Seoul, South Korea; Reuchinhaus, Pforzheim, Germany and Galerie Marian Heller Sandhausen, Germany; Mokkumto Gallery, Seoul, South Korea; and Tong-in Gallery, New York City, United States.

Collections

Park's contemporary ceramic art pieces are held at:

The Victoria and Albert Museum, London, United Kingdom
The British Crafts Council, London, United Kingdom
National Museum of Scotland, Edinburgh, United Kingdom
Nationalmuseum, Stockholm, Sweden
National Museum Of Contemporary Art, Seoul, South Korea
Malmö Museum, Malmo, Sweden
Röhsska Museum, Gothenburg, Sweden
Museum Of Painting and Sculpture, Istanbul, Turkey
Musée Ariana, Geneva, Switzerland
Museum of Decorative Art, Prague, Czech Republic
Museum of International Ceramics, Bechyne, Czech Republic
Museum of Porcelain, Loket, Czech Republic
Iris Collection, Porvoo, Finland
Coffee Cup Museum, Posio, Finland
Youngone Plaza, Seoul, South Korea
Total Museum, Seoul, South Korea
Daeyoo Cultural Foundation, South Korea
Royal Ontario Museum, Toronto, Canada
Ceramic and Glass Gallery, Waterloo, Canada

References

External links
Official Website
Gallery Marianne Heller, Suku Park exhibition
Kouvola.fi: Dialogue: Anu Pentik and Suku Park
Yourlapland.com: Dialogue: Anu Pentik and Suku Park
Tong-In Gallery, New York, Suku Park profile
"Amazon: International Competition - Fifth World Ceramic Biennale 2009 Korea, Introduction by Suku Park
Arctic Clay, Auction 2014

1947 births
Living people
South Korean artists
Seoul National University alumni
South Korean expatriates in Finland